Dabuhiyeh (also Romanized as Dābūhīyeh; also known as Dābūḩayeh and Dābūḩayeh-ye Jannat) is a village in Darkhoveyn Rural District, in the Central District of Shadegan County, Khuzestan Province, Iran. At the 2006 census, its population was 193, in 33 families.

References 

Populated places in Shadegan County